, best known as Rocky Aoki, was a Japanese-born American amateur wrestler and restaurateur who founded the popular Japanese cuisine restaurant chain Benihana, and Genesis magazine.

Biography

Early life 
Hiroaki Aoki was born in Tokyo, the son of Yunosuke Aoki and his wife, Katsu. Aoki and some friends started a rock and roll band called Rowdy Sounds, though Aoki eventually abandoned music for athletics. He would later explain, "I play bass. But I tell you why I change to wrestling: No good on tempo."

Aoki attended Keio University, where he competed in track and field, karate, and wrestling before being expelled for fighting. He qualified for the 1960 Summer Olympics for wrestling in Rome, but did not compete. However, he later toured the United States and was undefeated in the wrestling 112-pound flyweight class.

Aoki was offered wrestling scholarships from several different American colleges. He attended Springfield College in Springfield, Massachusetts, and later transferred to CW Post College on Long Island.

Move to the United States 
He moved to New York City, going on to win the United States flyweight title in 1962, 1963 and 1964. He was inducted into the National Wrestling Hall of Fame in 1995.

Restaurant business 
In New York, Aoki worked seven days a week in an ice cream truck that he rented in Harlem while studying restaurant management at New York City Community College.

After he received his associate degree in management in 1963, he used the $10,000 he had saved from the ice cream business to convince his father to co-invest in the first Benihana, a four-table teppanyaki restaurant on West 56th Street.  "Benihana", taken from the Japanese name for safflower, was suggested by Aoki's father. According to family legend, Aoki's father was walking through the bombed-out ruins of post-war Tokyo when he happened across a single red safflower growing in the rubble.

Personal life 
Aoki, who was married three times, once said that he had "three kids from three different women at exactly the same time." He found out about the seventh with the third woman when he was sued for paternity.

In August 1973, Aoki launched Genesis, a softcore pornographic men's magazine, with two centerfolds each issue. The title changed hands several times, eventually becoming an explicit publication long after Aoki's period of ownership. Despite not enjoying the mainstream popularity of rivals Playboy and Penthouse, the magazine remained in activity for nearly 40 years.

Aoki partially funded and crewed the Double Eagle V, the first balloon to successfully cross the Pacific Ocean.  The Double Eagle V launched from Nagashima, Japan on November 10, 1981, and landed in Mendocino National Forest in California 84 hours and 31 minutes later.  It traveled a record . The Double Eagle V's four-man crew consisted of Rocky Aoki with Albuquerque balloonists Ben Abruzzo, Larry Newman, and Ron Clark.  Overshadowed by the concurrent Space Shuttle mission STS-2, the Double Eagle V failed to attract the same degree of media attention as the earlier Double Eagle flights.

After injuries suffered in a 1982 accident, the Tenafly, New Jersey resident told sportswriters that he was leaving the sport. He was an offshore powerboat racer along with the 1986 APBA world champion Powerboat throttleman Errol Lanier, a former Fort Lauderdale, Florida fireman who saved his life in a near-fatal powerboat crash in 1979 under the Golden Gate Bridge.

His third wife was Keiko Aoki, a businesswoman whom he married in 2002. Before his death, he became a United States citizen.

Insider trading 
On June 9, 1998, Aoki was charged with insider trading and profiting by more than $590,000 from it. The U.S. Attorney's office in Brooklyn, N.Y. charged Aoki with six counts of insider trading and one count of conspiracy based on trading upon inside information about Spectrum Information Technologies Inc. 

According to the indictment, Aoki learned through Donald Kessler, a former stock promoter, inside information concerning Spectrum's imminent hiring of John Sculley, then-chairman of Apple Computer Inc., as the chairman of Spectrum, and bought 200,000 shares of Spectrum stock. That stock rose 46% the day that this hiring was publicized.

In 1999, Aoki pleaded guilty to insider trading charges and was fined $500,000 and given three years' probation.

Aoki was placed in deportation proceedings as a result of his guilty plea/conviction but was granted relief by an immigration judge and his permanent resident ("green card") status maintained. He eventually became a United States citizen.

Lawsuit against his children 
In 2005, he sued four of his children (Grace, Kevin, Kyle, and Echo) for an alleged attempt to take control of the companies he founded, which, at the time, had an estimated value between US$60–100 million.

Death 
Aoki died of pneumonia in New York City. At the time of his death he had been suffering from diabetes, Hepatitis C, and cirrhosis of the liver. His hepatitis was reportedly the result of a blood transfusion after a 1979 speedboat crash under the Golden Gate Bridge.

At the time of his death, Rocky Aoki had seven children and was married to his third wife Keiko. These included musician Steve Aoki and actress-model Devon Aoki. Model and singer-songwriter Yumi Nu is his granddaughter. His grave is at the cemetery attached to Joshin temple in Setagaya Ward, Tokyo.

Honors 
Aoki was the recipient of The International Center in New York's Award of Excellence.

References

External links 
 Benihana Restaurant
 

1938 births
2008 deaths
American people convicted of tax crimes
American people of Japanese descent
American restaurateurs
Businesspeople from New York City
Businesspeople from Tokyo
Deaths from pneumonia in New York City
Japanese emigrants to the United States
Japanese people convicted of tax crimes
Japanese restaurateurs
Japanese wrestlers
People from Tenafly, New Jersey
People with acquired American citizenship
Keio University alumni
Aviation in the Pacific Ocean
Deaths from diabetes
Deaths from hepatitis
20th-century American businesspeople
Aoki family